Tri Brata (literally: "three brothers") is a set of three rocks at the entrance to the Avacha Bay,  west of cape Mys Zhukova. The rocks are aligned east-west . This picturesque stack, or kekur, is considered a symbol of Petropavlovsk-Kamchatsky.

Local lore suggests that they are three brothers who went to defend the town from a tsunami and turned to stone.

External links

References 

Stacks (geology)
Uninhabited islands of the Pacific Ocean
Islands of Kamchatka Krai
Uninhabited islands of Russia
Natural monuments of Russia